Major General Bertram Frank Armstrong  (1893 - 1972) was a South African General officer.  He was the commanding officer of the 5th South African Brigade in the Western Desert Campaign in North Africa during World War II.

Military career 
General Armstrong joined the Natal Police in 1910 and was transferred to the South African Mounted Rifles in 1913.

He served in the British Army during World War I, but returned to the Union Defence Force in 1919. In 1923 he was shifted to the Garrison Artillery, and became the commanding officer in 1933.

At the outbreak of World War II, he served as Major General and commander of Natal Command and later as commander of 5th South African Brigade in North Africa. During this period he was taken prisoner of war. After his escape in 1944, he served as commander of Witwatersrand Command.

He later served as Quartermaster-General and Chief of the General Staff.

He retired on 28 January 1953.

Awards and decorations

References

South African Army generals
White South African people
South African military personnel of World War II
Companions of the Distinguished Service Order
1893 births
1972 deaths